= Adsit, Virginia =

Unincorporated community in Virginia, United States

Coordinates: 36°49′39″N 77°41′53″W

Adsit is an unincorporated community located in Brunswick County, in the U.S. state of Virginia.
